"On the Ground" is the debut solo single by  Korean-New Zealand singer and Blackpink member Rosé. It was released on 12 March 2021 by YG Entertainment as the lead single from her debut single album, R. It was written by Rosé alongside Amy Allen, Raúl Cubina, Jon Bellion, Jorgen Odegard and Teddy Park, and was produced by the latter three alongside Ojivolta and 24. The song is an electropop, pop rock and pop track with synth-pop elements. Its lyrics reflect Rosé's rise to fame, from singing and playing piano in her childhood home to flying to South Korea and forming one of K-pop's biggest acts.

An accompanying music video, directed by Han Sa-min, premiered the same day as the song's release. Upon release, the music video broke several YouTube records for a Korean solo artist, including for the most-watched premiere and the most views within 24 hours for a music video, accumulating 41.6 million views in that time. The song peaked at number four in South Korea and became the highest-charting song by a Korean female soloist on the US Billboard Hot 100, the Canadian Hot 100, the ARIA Singles Chart and the UK Singles Chart. The song also debuted at number one on both the Billboard Global 200 and Global Excl. U.S. charts, the first song by a Korean solo artist to do so.  "On the Ground" received generally favorable reviews from music critics, who complimented its lyrics and Rosé's vocals.

To promote "On the Ground", the singer appeared and performed on several South Korean music programs including M Countdown, Inkigayo, and Show! Music Core. On 24 March 2021, Rosé received her first ever music show win for the song on Show Champion. Since then she has achieved five more music show wins for the track on M Countdown, Music Bank, Show! Music Core, and Inkigayo.

Background and release
On 30 December 2020, in an interview with South Korean media outlet Osen, Rosé revealed that filming for her debut music video would begin in mid-January 2021. On 25 January 2021, a 33-second teaser titled "Coming Soon" was uploaded to Blackpink's official YouTube channel and featured Rosé singing an snippet of an unknown track. Rosé's label YG Entertainment disclosed that she had "completed all filming for her solo album title track's music video in mid-January", and the release will be "surely different from Blackpink's usual musical style". On 2 March 2021, it was announced that Rosé would debut her solo project on 12 March, making her the first Blackpink member to release solo material since Jennie's "Solo" in November 2018. The next day, new teaser poster unveiled the name of the lead single, "On the Ground", for the first time. The first music video teaser for "On the Ground" was released on 7 March. On 8 March, YG revealed the album track listing, which confirmed first-time songwriting contributions from Rosé on the title track. On 9 March, the second music video teaser for the title track was published. "On the Ground" was released for digital download and streaming as the lead single from R on 12 March 2021, by YG Entertainment.

Composition
"On the Ground" was written by Amy Allen, Raúl Cubina, Jon Bellion, Jorgen Odegard, Teddy Park, and Rosé, and was produced by the latter three alongside Ojivolta and 24. The song is an electropop, pop rock and pop song with synth-pop elements and an EDM-inspired beat, complemented by a simple guitar. The track features wispy, melodic verses accompanied by "breathy" vocals, chorus that boasts the dance-pop punch, angelic bridge, and Rosé's high note at the end. The track sees Rosé reflecting on her life as a global K-pop superstar and she realizes what really matters in her life already lies within herself. She created the single's name herself and considers it to be the most successful line in all the songs that she has ever sung. It means that everything that the singer needs is here, "on earth," and there is no need to rush somewhere to find this necessary. In terms of musical notation, the song is composed in the key of C# major, with a tempo of 189 beats per minute, and runs for two minutes and forty-eight seconds.

Critical reception
Following the release of "On the Ground", it was met with generally positive reviews from music critics. Ashlee Mitchell from MTV noted that "On the Ground" provides "the perfect contrast, taking a more confident stance, reminding listeners of the importance of being true to yourself." Writing for Beats Per Minute, JT Early described the song as a "feel-good song about realising what’s important." Madison Murray of Young Hollywood described the song as an "empowering anthem about Rosé’s experience in the spotlight and how she learned her true inner strength." Writing for NME, Rhian Daly described the song as a "breezy, EDM-infused pop song". Jo Ji-Hyun of IZM gave the song a three-star rating, praising its "soft and strong message" and noting Rosé's vocals for "creat[ing] a higher level of completeness." Divyansha Dongre from the India version of Rolling Stone described "On the Ground" as "an electric pop anthem with a catchy guitar riff and picturesque set designs." Alice Bailey, reviewer of the French fashion magazine Elle, called the song "a moving, beautiful, and lyrically-deep lead single." Anna Chan from Billboard described it as "an empowering and thoughtful song about finding purpose within yourself."

Year-end lists
Billboard magazine ranked the song at number 39 in their list of 50 Best Songs of 2021 So Far, stating that "If you couldn't get enough of Blackpink in late 2020, Rosé was here to serve in early 2021." Tamar Herman of South China Morning Post selected "On the Ground" as one of the 10 best songs of 2021, writing: "The Blackpink vocalist’s first solo project starts off promising to be an introspective acoustic pop song, then turns into a reflective electric track that illustrates Rosé’s clean vocals."

Commercial performance
"On the Ground" debuted at number one on both the Billboard Global 200 and the Global Excl. U.S. charts with 92.1 million global streams and 29,000 global downloads sold, the first to do so in the charts' histories. The song charted on the Global 200 for seven weeks, becoming the longest-charting song by a K-pop soloist until later surpassed by bandmate Lisa's songs "Lalisa" and "Money". In South Korea, "On the Ground" debuted at number fifteen on the Gaon Digital Chart on the eleventh issued week (March 7–13), with less than two days of tracking. The following week, the song entered the top ten with "Gone" and peaked at number four, marking her first top-ten solo entries in the country. The song also managed to peak at number one in Singapore and Malaysia.

In the United States, the song debuted and peaked at number 70 on the US Billboard Hot 100, becoming the highest-charting song by a Korean female soloist in the US. The song collected 6.4 million streams, 0.3 million radio impressions, and 7,500 digital sales in its first week. In the United Kingdom, "On the Ground" debuted and peaked at number 43 on the UK Singles Chart, simultaneously becoming the first and highest-charting song by a Korean female solo artist on the chart. Similarly, the song landed at number three on the New Zealand Hot Singles chart, number 49 on Irish Singles Chart, and number 31 in Australia's ARIA Charts. In Canada, "On the Ground" arrived at number 35 on the Canadian Hot 100, generating the singer's first top-40 entry in the country.

Music video

Background
An accompanying music video for the song was directed by Han Sa-min and uploaded to Blackpink's official YouTube channel in conjunction with the release of the single album. After twelve hours, the music video reached 23 million views, making it the fastest music video by a soloist to reach 20 million views in the history of K-pop at the time. When the video premiered at 12:00AM EST, it garnered over 1.2 million peak concurrent viewers. With 41.6 million views within 24 hours, "On the Ground" gained the title at the time of the most-viewed Korean music video by a soloist in 24 hours on YouTube, breaking the almost eight-year record held by Psy with his song "Gentleman". The music video became the fastest to hit 100 million views for a female solo artist, doing so in seven days after release. The music video surpassed 200 million views on 13 July 2021. The behind the scenes video was uploaded a day after the release of the music video on 13 March 2021. A dance practice video was uploaded on 23 March. In it, the singer is accompanied by background dancers who are all dressed in the same all-black outfit. Its dance was choreographed by Kiel Tutin and Kyle Hanagami.

Synopsis
The video begins with a comet falling from the sky. Then Rosé is shown sitting in a bedroom, when a chandelier falls from the ceiling. The next scene features Rosé leaving a theatre dressed in a black bodysuit with a long, feathery train, large black puffer sleeves and knee-high boots. The singer is then shown running in a feathery bodysuit and a ruffled mini skirt, while electric fuses go on in the background. Next, the singer is seen wearing a ruched lavender ballgown and cream-colored fur jacket while sitting in the back of a car and looking dreamily out the car window. Later in the video the singer is shown all in black accompanied by six Rosé clones wearing white dresses. They stand on a stone staircase with a sign that reads "Roses are Dead, Love is Fake." Then the music video shows Rosé in her childhood home, admiring her pre-fame self Roseanne in a softy cropped cardigan, denim cut-off shorts, and a t-shirt, playing piano. As the song closes, the singer is wearing a pink ruffled dress, while floating in a field of flowers. At the end, the singer is shown posing with a burning limousine in the background.

Live performances
On 14 March 2021, Rosé performed "Gone" and "On the Ground" for the first time live on SBS's Inkigayo. On 16 March, Rosé performed the single on The Tonight Show Starring Jimmy Fallon, marking her first solo performance on American television. In the performance Rosé is seen in a black-and-white clip that found her singing while running through elaborate choreography with an array of back-up dancers. On 18 March 2021, she performed "On the Ground" on Mnet's M Countdown. The singer performed the song on Show! Music Core on 20 March. The song was performed again on Inkigayo on 21 March. On 27 March, Rosé performed the song on Show! Music Core. On 28 March, the singer performed "On the Ground" on Inkigayo. On 30 March, Rosé performed "On the Ground" on Japanese channel Nippon TV's morning show Sukkiri.

Accolades

Cover versions
On May 11, Brie Larson posted her acoustic rendition of the Korean singer's  single on both her social media accounts, alongside a caption that read: "A little ROSÉ magic for you". Rosé showed her appreciation via her Instagram Stories, adding a heart emoji above the video.

Credits and personnel

 Roseanne Park – lead vocals, writer
 Amy Allen – writer
 Jon Bellion – producer, writer
 Jorgen Odegard – producer, writer
 Raúl Cubina – writer
 Teddy Park – producer, writer
 24 – producer
 Ojivalta – producer
 Josh Gudwin – mixing
 Randy Merrill – mastering
 Yongin Choi – recording

Charts

Weekly charts

Monthly charts

Year-end charts

Release history

See also

 List of Billboard Global 200 number ones of 2021
 List of Inkigayo Chart winners (2021)
 List of K-pop songs on the Billboard charts
 List of M Countdown Chart winners (2021)
 List of Music Bank Chart winners (2021)
 List of Show Champion Chart winners (2021)
 List of Show! Music Core Chart winners (2021)
 List of number-one songs of 2021 (Malaysia)
 List of number-one songs of 2021 (Singapore)

References

2021 songs
2021 debut singles
Songs written by Teddy Park
Songs written by Amy Allen (songwriter)
Songs written by Jon Bellion
Interscope Records singles
Rosé (singer) songs
YG Entertainment singles
English-language South Korean songs
Billboard Global 200 number-one singles
Billboard Global Excl. U.S. number-one singles
Number-one singles in Malaysia
Number-one singles in Singapore